Thor Reirsen Lilleholt (3 March 1770  –12  May 1822) was a Norwegian farmer and district sheriff who served as a representative at the Norwegian Constitutional Assembly.

Thor Reirsen Lilleholt was born on the Lilleholt farm in Holt parish in Aust-Agder, Norway. During the period 1803–17, he was sheriff in Holt, and from 1803 to 1812 also in the neighboring parish of Dypvåg. In 1793, he married Asborg Undersdtr (1770–1812) with whom he had five children.

He represented Nedenæs amt (now Aust-Agder) at the Norwegian Constituent Assembly in 1814, together with Jacob Aall and Hans Jacob Grøgaard. 
At the Assembly, he supported the union party (unionspartiet).

References

1770 births
1822 deaths
Aust-Agder politicians
Fathers of the Constitution of Norway
People from Arendal